Carl Olsen (16 February 1893 – 13 February 1968) was a Norwegian cyclist. He competed in two events at the 1912 Summer Olympics.

References

External links
 

1893 births
1968 deaths
Norwegian male cyclists
Olympic cyclists of Norway
Cyclists at the 1912 Summer Olympics
Cyclists from Oslo